Erebus macfarlanei is a moth of the family Erebidae. It is found in Queensland and from the Southern Moluccas and Indonesia (including Papua New Guinea and Ambon) to the Solomon Islands.

References

External links
Australian Caterpillars

Moths described in 1876
Erebus (moth)